Warrensburg Mills Historic District is a national historic district located at Warrensburg, Warren County, New York.  It includes 58 contributing buildings and four contributing structures. It encompasses a number of mill complexes and homes related to the development of Warrensburg.  It includes a mill dam, Emerson Sawmill (ca. 1820), grist mill, early shirt factory (1878), later shirt factory (1898), office building (1855), coal storage shed (ca. 1920), grain warehouses, and 51 wood residences and one brick residence.  Also within the district are the Osborne Bridge (ca. 1930), and Woolen Mill Bridge (ca. 1895, constructed by Croton Bridge Builders).

It was added to the National Register of Historic Places in 1975.

References

External links

Warrensburg Mills Historic District Map

Historic districts on the National Register of Historic Places in New York (state)
Historic districts in Warren County, New York
National Register of Historic Places in Warren County, New York